Irigenin is an O-methylated isoflavone, a type of flavonoid. It can be isolated from the rhizomes of the leopard lily (Belamcanda chinensis), and Iris kemaonensis.

Glycosides 
Iridin is the 7-glucoside of irigenin.

References 

O-methylated isoflavones
Resorcinols